The Ariel Award for Best Supporting Actress (Spanish: Premio Ariel a Mejor Coactuación Femenina) is an award presented by the Academia Mexicana de Artes y Ciencias Cinematográficas (AMACC) in Mexico. It is given in honor of an actor who has delivered an outstanding performance in a supporting role while working within the Mexican film industry. In 1947, the 1st and 2nd Ariel Awards were held, with Lilia Michel winning in both ceremonies for the films Un Beso en la Noche and Vértigo, respectively. With the exception of the years 1959 to 1971, when the Ariel Awards were suspended, the award has been given annually. Nominees and winners are determined by a committee formed every year consisting of academy members (active and honorary), previous winners and individuals with at least two Ariel nominations; the committee members submit their votes through the official AMACC website.

Since its inception, the award has been given to 52 actresses. Ana Ofelia Murguía and Isela Vega had received the most awards in this category with three Ariels each. Angélica Aragón, Katy Jurado, Ofelia Medina, Lilia Michel, Angelina Peláez, and Eileen Yáñez have been awarded twice; Jurado was also the first Mexican actress to be nominated for an Academy Award for Best Supporting Actress for the film Broken Lance (1954). Murguía is the most nominated performer, with eight nominations, followed by Aragón with six. In 2019, Cassandra Ciangherotti became the first performer to be nominated twice the same year, with their supporting roles in the films El Club de los Insomnes and Las Niñas Bien. Noche de Fuego (2021) is the first film to feature three nominated performances for supporting actress: Mayra Batalla, Norma Pablo, and Eileen Yáñez with Batalla winning the award. 

Twenty one films have featured two nominated performances for Best Supporting Actress, Una Familia de Tantas (Eugenia Galindo and Martha Roth), Fin de Fiesta (Ana Martín and Helena Rojo), Actas de Marusia (Silvia Mariscal and Patricia Reyes Spíndola), Las Poquianchis (Ana Ofelia Murguía and María Rojo), El Lugar Sin Límites (Ana Martín and Lucha Villa), Que Viva Tepito (Leonor Llausás and Rebeca Silva), Vidas Errantes (Eugenia D'Silva and Josefina González de la Riva), Los Motivos de Luz (Murguía and Dunia Zaldívar), Como Agua Para Chocolate (Pilar Aranda and Claudette Maillé), Novia Que Te Vea (Angélica Aragón and Verónica Langer), Dos Crimenes (Leticia Huijara and Margarita Isabel), Mujeres Insumisas (Regina Orozco and Lourdes Elizarrarás), Profundo Carmesí (Julieta Egurrola and Verónica Merchant, Por Si No Te Vuelvo a Ver (Zaide Silvia Gutiérrez and Angelina Peláez), Un Embrujo (Luisa Huertas and Mayra Sérbulo), Mezcal (Aída López and Sérbulo), Fuera del Cielo (Martha Higareda and Isela Vega), Cinco Días Sin Nora (Langer and Peláez), Las Oscuras Primaveras (Margarita Sanz and Cecilia Suárez), Las Niñas Bien (Cassandra Ciangherotti and Paulina Gaitán), Leona (Sanz and Carolina Politti); Roth, Helena Rojo, Reyes Spíndola, María Rojo, Villa, Murguía, Maillé, Aragón, Isabel, Egurrola, Vega, and Peláez won the award. As of the 2022 ceremony, Mayra Batalla is the most recent winner in this category for her role in Noche de Fuego.

Winners and nominees

Multiple wins and nominations 

The following individuals have received multiple Best Supporting Actress awards:

The following actresses received three or more Best Supporting Actress nominations:

See also 
 Academy Award for Best Supporting Actress

References

Ariel Awards
Film awards for supporting actress